The Mercedes-Benz S-Series (W06) was a successful line of sports cars produced from 1927-33 that bore the nickname, the "white elephants."

Origin
In the run-up to the merger between Daimler and Benz & Cie, a race-oriented version of Daimler's Type 630 luxury car was produced with a modified chassis that was called the Model K (K for 'Kurzer Radstand' or short wheelbase in English). The new Daimler-Benz corporation, which produced cars under the brand name Mercedes-Benz, decided that it would create an even more advanced race car building upon the best features of the Model K, which would be called the Model S (S for Sport).

Model S

This engine was given a design code of M06, and using the naming convention that became standard after the merger. The letter M for motor designates the engine and W for wagen (or wagon) refers to the vehicles so that the S-Series had the design code W06. The new engine M06 got an increase of 40 horsepower producing 180 hp with the supercharger engaged. The result was that the engine was lower and there was improved weight distribution which improved stability and handling.

Model SS

In mid-1928 a new version of the Model S was produced designated as the SS or Super Sport. The SS was intended as a grand tourer.

Model SSK
 
While the S and SS were successful in races for sheer speed, they did not perform as well in terms of turning ability. Hence, in late 1928, a new version of the S-Series was created to compete in hill climbs.

Model SSKL (WS06RS)

The SSK experienced success in competitive racing and was a best seller. In 1931 a pure racing version was produced in a limited run that was not offered through the ordinary sales program but was made available only for competitive racers. This was designated as the SSKL for Super Sport Kurz Leicht (or Super Sport Short Light). The fourth and final model in the S-Series was a lightweight version of the high-performance SSK. Of particular interest is the SSKL belonging to Manfred von Brauchitsch, which he had clad in an aerodynamic skin of aluminium sheets. Broadcasters covering the event on radio referred to the aluminium bodied car as a 'silver arrow.'

End of the programme

Daimler-Benz enjoyed great success in competition with the S-series, but at the same time these cars, including the SSK, were suitable for everyday driving and helped by the fact that the styling of the cars was considered to be very attractive, they were purchased by wealthy customers who used them that way. However, by 1934 this was not seen as a practical approach going forward. Instead, the different roles would need to fulfilled by distinct lines of cars. The 500K would be marketed as a mass-produced sporty but elegant luxury car, while success in competition would come from a new series of cars that were not at all suitable for ordinary use, but which would become racing legends: the silver arrows.

References 

S-Series
Sports cars
Cars introduced in 1927